The 2022–23 Úrvalsdeild kvenna is the 66th season of the Úrvalsdeild kvenna, the top tier women's basketball league on Iceland.

Competition format
The participating teams first play a conventional round-robin schedule with every team playing each opponent twice "home" and twice "away" for a total of 28 games. The top four teams qualify for the championship playoffs whilst the bottom team will be relegated to 1. deild kvenna.

Teams

Managerial changes

Notable occurrences
On 30 May, Birna Valgerður Benónýsdóttir signed with Keflavík after spending the previous three seasons playing college basketball for Arizona and Binghamton.
On 7 June, Elín Sóley Hrafnkelsdóttir signed with Valur after playing the previous four seasons with the University of Tulsa.
On 7 June, Bríet Sif Hinriksdóttir signed with Njarðvík after spending the previous two seasons with Haukar.
On 5 July, Njarðvík signed Portuguese national team member Raquel Laneiro.
On 5 July, Sanja Orozović signed with Breiðablik after playing the previous season with Fjölnir. She previously played for Breiðablik during the 2018–19 season.
On 26 July, Hildur Björg Kjartansdóttir left Valur and signed with BC Namur-Capitale of the Belgian Women's Basketball League.
On 31 October, Isabella Ósk Sigurðardóttir left Breiðablik after appearing in 7 games, where she averaged 12.3 points and 13.3 rebounds, and signed with reigning national champions Njarðvík.
On 15 November, Maja Michalska signed with Fjölnir after having been without a team since the folding of Skallagrímur in December 2021.
On 21 November, Embla Kristínardóttir signed with Valur.
On 4 December, Hildur Björg Kjartansdóttir returned to Iceland after starting the season with BC Namur-Capitale in Belgium and signed back with Valur.
On 14 December, Tinna Guðrún Alexandersdóttir of Haukar became the third Icelandic player to have back-to-back 30 points games in the Úrvalsdeild.
On 2 January, Keflavík announced that Emelía Ósk Gunnarsdóttir was returning to the team after spending the previous months pursuing an education in Sweden.
On 13 January, Fjölnir signed former Úrvalsdeild Foreign Player of the Year, Brittanny Dinkins, to replace Taylor Dominique Jones.
On 25 January, it was reported that Sigrún Sjöfn Ámundadóttir had resigned as player and assistant coach at Fjölnir, following the teams loss to winless ÍR, citing different vision of the team tactics and play with head coach Kristjana Eir Jónsdóttir. Two days later, she signed with Haukar.
On 8 March, Sigrún Sjöfn Ámundadóttir became the Úrvalsdeild kvenna all-time leader in games played, breaking Birna Valgarðsdóttir's record of 375 games.

References

External links
Official Icelandic Basketball Federation website

Icelandic
Lea
Úrvalsdeild kvenna seasons (basketball)